Kemerköy power station is a 630 MW coal-fired power station in Turkey in Kemerköy, Muğla, completed in 1985, which burns lignite mined locally. Originally state owned by Electricity Generation Company it was sold in 2014 to Limak- IC İçtaş. In 2020 it received 140 million lira ($) capacity payments. 

The area is a sulfur dioxide air pollution hotspot and  the air pollution caused by Kemerköy and neighboring Yatağan power station and Yeniköy power station is estimated to have caused 45,000 premature deaths. It is estimated that closing the plant by 2030, instead of when its licence ends in 2063, would prevent over 5000 premature deaths.

In 2019 local people protested against 48 villages being destroyed by expansion of the mine feeding the plant. The company has been granted a permit to cut down Akbelen Forest to make way for the mine expansion, but in 2021 inhabitant of İkizköy village continue to protest and filed a lawsuit claiming that the permit should not have been granted without an environmental impact assessment. The company says that Akbelen was allocated to the coal  mine when the power plant was built, and that the General Directorate of Forestry defined it as an “industrial plantation area for 2019”.

The plant was inspected by Istanbul Technical University in 2019 before new pollution regulations came into force at the beginning of 2020, and they made various improvement recommendations, such as better groundwater monitoring near the ash ponds. Despite improvements such as better air filters not being completed on all units, the plant was allowed to operate on a temporary licence in 2020, and in January 2021 the plant was granted a second temporary operating licence with a requirement to submit an environmental report to the ministry in June. The plant was evacuated due to and slightly damaged by the 2021 Turkish wildfires.

References

External links 
 Kemerköy power station on Global Energy Monitor

Coal-fired power stations in Turkey